Oedibasis is a genus of flowering plants belonging to the family Apiaceae.

Its native range is Central Asia to Afghanistan.

Species:

Oedibasis apiculata 
Oedibasis pachyphylla 
Oedibasis platycarpa 
Oedibasis tamerlanii

References

Apioideae
Apioideae genera